Heckmondwike railway station was one of two stations to serve the town of Heckmondwike, in the historical county of West Riding of Yorkshire, England, the other being .

History

First station 

Coordinates: 
 
The first station was opened as Heckmondwike on 18 July 1848 by the Lancashire and Yorkshire Railway. It had a goods yard and a station building. The station closed on 9 August 1888 and was resited.

Second station 

Coordinates: 

The station was resited to the west and opened as Heckmondwike on 9 August 1888. The goods yard was not moved from the original station. Its name was changed to Heckmondwike Central on 2 June 1924 but it was changed back to Heckmondwike on 12 June 1961 (As the other railway station in Heckmondwike, Heckmondwike Spen closed the previous year. There was no platform by then so the work men had to use the steps to board the train.

Route

Now
Sustrans with Kirklees Council have opened a cycle route, National Cycle Route 66, on the old railway track

References 

Disused railway stations in West Yorkshire
Former Lancashire and Yorkshire Railway stations
Railway stations in Great Britain opened in 1848
Railway stations in Great Britain closed in 1888
Railway stations in Great Britain opened in 1888
Railway stations in Great Britain closed in 1965
1848 establishments in England
1965 disestablishments in England
Beeching closures in England
Heckmondwike